Francesco Tatti da Sansovino (1521–1586) was a versatile Italian scholar, humanist (one of the most important of his century) and man of letters, also known as a publisher.

Biography 

Francesco Sansovino was born in Rome, the son of the sculptor Jacopo Sansovino, but soon moved to Venice and later studied law at the universities of Padua and Bologna.

Works

Sansovino is perhaps most known for his 1581 work Venetia città nobilissima et singolare, Descritta in XIIII. Libri, known briefly as Venezia Descritta. He was also a literary critic, writing in particular on Dante and Giovanni Boccaccio.

 Del governo e amministrazione di diversi regni e republiche (1562)
 Della materia medicinale, Venice,  Giovanni Andrea Valvassori, 1562.
 Del governo e amministrazione di diversi regni e republiche (1562)
 
 Dell'origine dei Cavalieri, Venice, 1566.
Venetia, città nobilissima, et singolare, Descritta in XIIII libri (1581); 1663 edition
Le antichità di Beroso Caldeo Sacerdote. Et d'altri scrittori, così Hebrei, come Greci et Latini, che trattano delle stesse materie (1583)
Concetti politici (1583) found in Propositioni, overo considerationi in materia di cose di Stato, sotto titolo di avvertimenti, avvedimenti civili et concetti politici (1588)
Historia universale dell'origine et imperio de'Turchi: Con le guerre successe in Persia, in Ongaria, in Transilvania, Valachia, sino l'anno 1600 (1600)

References

External links

1521 births
1586 deaths
Italian male writers